Brian Iles is an American animation director. Iles is known for directing several episodes of the animated TV series Family Guy.

Iles has also served as a storyboard revisionist and as a character layout artist on Drawn Together and The Oblongs, respectively.

Family Guy
Iles joined Family Guy in 2007. He has since directed multiple episodes, including:
"Boys Do Cry" (2007)
"McStroke" (2008)
"Back to the Woods" (2008)
"Family Gay" (2009)
"Peter's Progress" (2009)
"Jerome is the New Black" (2009)
"The Splendid Source" (2010)
"The Hand That Rocks the Wheelchair" (2011)
"Seahorse Seashell Party" (2011)
"Cool Hand Peter" (2011)
"Forget-Me-Not" (2012)
"The Old Man and the Big 'C'" (2012)
"The Giggity Wife" (2013)
"Save the Clam"  (2013)
"Into Harmony's Way" (2013)
"Baby Got Black" (2014)
"This Little Piggy" (2015)
"Fighting Irish" (2015)
'"A Shot in the Dark" (2015)
"The Heartbreak Dog" (2016)
"Chris Has Got a Date, Date, Date, Date, Date" (2016)
"The Dating Game" (2017)
"Foxx in the Men House" (2017)
"Pal Stewie" (2018)
"Con Heiress" (2018)
"Throw It Away" (2019)
"Shanksgiving" (December 15, 2019)

References

External links

American television directors
Living people
People from Long Island
1975 births
People from Sterling, Virginia